Cantharellus cascadensis, the Cascade chanterelle, is a fungus native to the Pacific Northwest region of North America. It is a member of the genus Cantharellus along with other popular edible chanterelles.  It is named after the Cascade Range, where it was formally described in 2003.

History
Both Cantharellus cascadensis and C. roseocanus were first considered to be varieties of Cantharellus cibarius, then of C. formosus. C. cascadensis was genetically classified as its own species in 2003.

Description
The cap is usually bright yellow with a smooth or wooly surface. The stipe is club-shaped to bulbous.

Similar species
Several other species of chanterelle may be found in western North America:
C. californicus
C. formosus
C. roseocanus
C. subalbidus

Additionally, Hygrophoropsis aurantiaca, Chroogomphus tomentosus, and species in the genera Craterellus, Gomphus, Omphalotus, and Polyozellus may have a somewhat similar appearance to C. cascadensis.

References

External links

cascadensis
Fungi of Canada
Fungi of California
Cascade Range
Fungi described in 2003
Fungi without expected TNC conservation status